The Oxford Robotics Institute (ORI) is an interdisciplinary division within the University of Oxford. It is dedicated to researching robotics, artificial intelligence, systems engineering, and other related fields. The ORI is a subsidiary of the Department of Engineering Science.

Information engineering Professor Paul Newman is the current director of the ORI.

Sub-divisions (Labs) 
The ORI is divided into five groups, each with a different specialisation.

 Mobile Robotics Group (MRG): navigation systems, autonomous vehicles. This group is headed by Paul Newman, who is also the founder of Oxbotica. 
 Applied AI Lab (A2I): artificial intelligence and machine learning. 
 Dynamic Robot Systems Group (DRS): control, motion planning, mapping, and navigation for dynamically moving robots. 
 Goal-Oriented Long-Lived Systems (GOALS): long-term autonomy and planning for robots operating for long periods of time in uncertain dynamic environments.
 Estimation, Search & Planning Group (ESP): algorithm design for estimation, search and path planning of mobile robots.
 Soft Robotics Lab: explores how compliance in the robot body can be exploited for dealing with task and environment uncertainty and for interacting with humans.

Activities 
Among the ORI's projects are various autonomous vehicles as a part of the Mobile Robotics Group's Robotcar project. There have been various iterations of the hardware and software used in these experiments. The first vehicle used as a research platform by the Mobile Robotics Group was a Bowler Wildcat provided by BAE Systems in 2011. Since then, various Land Rovers as well as other models (such as the Nissan Leaf) have been used as subsequent generations of research platforms.

References 

Robotics organizations